is a Japanese football player who plays for Gainare Tottori. He plays for Gainare Tottori.

Club statistics
Updated to 23 February 2020.

References

External links
Profile at Zweigen Kanazawa

1992 births
Living people
Senshu University alumni
Association football people from Tokyo
Japanese footballers
J2 League players
Zweigen Kanazawa players
J3 League players
Gainare Tottori players
Association football midfielders